John Mackintosh Foot, Baron Foot (17 February 1909 – 11 October 1999) was a British Liberal politician and Life Peer.

Family
John Foot was born at Pencrebar, Callington, Cornwall, the third son of Isaac Foot (1880–1960) and his wife Eva Mackintosh (died 1946). His father was a solicitor and founder of the Plymouth law firm of Foot and Bowden. Isaac was also an active member of the Liberal Party, the Liberal MP for Bodmin before World War II and the Lord Mayor of Plymouth after the war. His elder siblings were barrister Sir Dingle Foot, QC (1905–1978), who subsequently became both a Liberal and Labour MP and Hugh Foot, Baron Caradon (1907–1990), who became Governor of Cyprus (1957–1960) and then the UK representative to the United Nations (1964–1970). His younger siblings were Margaret Elizabeth Foot (1911–1965), Michael Foot (1913–2010), a Labour MP, Cabinet Minister and Leader of the Opposition (1980–1983), Jennifer Mackintosh Highet (1916-2002) and Christopher Isaac Foot (1917-1984).

He married an American, Anne (Bailey Farr) in 1936 and they had a son and a daughter.

Early life
He was educated at Forres School, Swanage and then Bembridge School on the Isle of Wight. He went on to read jurisprudence at Balliol College, Oxford, where he was President of the Oxford Union in 1931, following in the steps of his elder brother Dingle (1928) and preceding his younger brother Michael (1933). After graduation he joined the family law firm before serving in the Wessex Division, reaching the rank of Major, and also on the HQ Staff of the 21st Army Group during World War II. After the war he rejoined the family law firm and subsequently became the senior partner there following the death of his father in 1960.

Political career
Foot was considered by brother Michael as the best orator and the "ablest member of the family". He first stood as a Liberal candidate in a 1934 by-election, in the safe Conservative seat of Basingstoke, and ran again there in the 1935 general election. In both the 1945 and 1950 elections, he stood in Bodmin, being defeated by the Conservative Sir Douglas Marshall on both occasions. He remained in the Liberal Party during the long period of its post-war decline and was subsequently made a life peer on 29 November 1967 as Baron Foot, of Buckland Monachorum in the County of Devon.

He served as Chairman of the UK Immigrants Advisory Service from 1970 to 1978 where he did not hesitate to criticise the Wilson Government for the inadequate fulfilment of their pledges to the persecuted Kenyan and Ugandan Asians. He was also a robust environmental defender of Dartmoor against the expansionist ambitions of Plymouth Council. He was a patron of Humanists UK until his death.

Death
He died aged 90 on 11 October 1999, survived by his wife and children.

Arms

References

FOOT, Baron, Who Was Who, A & C Black, 1920–2008; online edn, Oxford University Press, Dec 2012
Lord Foot (obituary), The Guardian, London, 16 October 1999

1909 births
1999 deaths
Foot, John
Presidents of the Oxford Union
Alumni of Balliol College, Oxford
John
People from Buckland Monachorum
Politicians from Plymouth, Devon
People educated at Bembridge School
People from Callington, Cornwall
English humanists
British Army officers
Military personnel from Cornwall
British Army personnel of World War II
Life peers created by Elizabeth II